Oberea lateapicalis is a species of beetle in the family Cerambycidae. It was described by Maurice Pic in 1939.

References

lateapicalis
Beetles described in 1939